This list of chemical elements named after places includes elements named both directly and indirectly for places. 41 of the 118 chemical elements have names associated with, or specifically named for, places around the world or among astronomical objects.  32 of these have names tied to the Earth and the other 9 have names connected to bodies in the Solar System.  The first tables below list the terrestrial locations (excluding the entire Earth itself, taken as a whole) and the last table lists astronomical objects which the chemical elements are named after.

Terrestrial locations

Astronomical objects

* - The element mercury was named directly for the deity, with only indirect naming connection to the planet (see etymology of mercury).

See also
 List of chemical elements named after people
 List of chemical element name etymologies

References

Places
History of science
Lists of chemical elements
Periodic table
Chemical elements, used in the names of